Galgameth (also released under the titles The Legend of Galgameth and The Adventures of Galgameth) is a 1996 American fantasy children's film directed by Sean McNamara. The film stars Devin Neil Oatway, Johna Stewart and Stephen Macht. The film's script is loosely based on Shin Sang-ok's 1985 film Pulgasari, which he had directed while being held in North Korea and which was itself a remake of a lost 1962 film.

Plot
In the medieval kingdom of Donnegold, a young prince named Davin (Devin Oatway) lives with his father, the noble King Henryk (Sean McNamara). But that comes to an end when the King's black knight, El El (Stephen Macht), poisons him. As he lays dying, Henryk gives his son a small black statue of a creature. He tells him that it is called "Galgameth", the family guardian of legend. Davin takes it and while he is away mourning his father, El El secretly shatters the statue and takes command, thrusting the kingdom into turmoil under Davin's name. Davin is given the broken statue by a maidservant and cries. The next morning he finds that the statue has become a living creature which he nicknames "Galgy" (Felix Silla and Doug Jones). Brought to life by the prince's tears, Galgameth becomes his friend and guardian as he finds himself chased by El El and in the company of disgruntled peasants who are planning a revolt in order to dethrone the man they think is the source of all their trouble, Prince Davin.

Cast
 Devin Oatway as Prince Davin
 Sean McNamara as King Henryk
 Stephen Macht as El El
 Lou Wagner as Zethar
 Time Winters as Templeton
 James Nixon as Bertrand
 Felix Silla as Little Galgy
 Doug Jones as Big Galgy
 Brendan O'Brien as Heretic
 Tom Dugan as William
 Richard Steven Horvitz as Kinch
 Elizabeth Cheap as Periel
 Patrick Richwood as Grecy
 Ken Thorley as Footy
 Johna Stewart-Bowden as Julia
 Corneliu Țigancu as Zhidao

Production
The production was filmed on locations in Romania, including Bucharest and Zărnești.

Release
Original release was in Spain on November 18, 1996, followed by release in Japan on November 21. Its original Romanian title was Galgameth and had differing titles dependent upon the country and language of later releases. In Germany it was released as Galgameth - Das Ungeheuer des Prinzen. In Spain its video title was as La leyenda de Galgameth and its television release title was Galgameth - El guerrero invencible. In France it was released as Galgameth: L'apprenti dragon. English release titles included both The Legend of Galgameth and the later The Adventures of Galgameth, which was released by Trimark Home Video on July 29, 1997.

References

External links

Films directed by Sean McNamara
1996 films
Romanian children's films
American children's films
American remakes of foreign films
English-language Romanian films
Puppet films
Films shot in Romania
Films shot in Bucharest
Kaiju films
Giant monster films
1990s English-language films
1990s American films
1990s Japanese films